Plaza Egaña is a transfer station between the Line 3 and Line 4 of the Santiago Metro. It is
located under Egaña Square. The Line 4 station was opened on 30 November 2005 as part of the inaugural section of the line between Tobalaba and Grecia. The Line 3 station was opened on 22 January 2019 as part of the inaugural section of the line, from Los Libertadores to Fernando Castillo Velasco.

The cross-section of the platform-level tunnel has the shape of two partially intersecting circles, which was so designed due to the predominant presence of clay in the surrounding soil.

References

Santiago Metro stations
Railway stations opened in 2005
Santiago Metro Line 3
Santiago Metro Line 4